Trichromia repanda is a moth in the family Erebidae. It was described by Francis Walker in 1855. It is found in French Guiana, Brazil, Amazonas, Venezuela, Ecuador, Peru and Bolivia.

References

Moths described in 1855
repanda